At least four vessels of the Royal Navy have borne the name HMS Mullett, Mullet, or Mulette.

  or Mullet was the French Dromadaire-class Mulet, launched c. May 1782 based on plans by Jean-Joseph Ginoux, originally classed as a barge and then as a flûte (1784). She was armed with eighteen to twenty 6 or 8-pounder guns. The British captured her at Toulon in 1793 and commissioned her as the sloop Mulette (or Mullet). She was broken up in 1796.
  was a  that was built in Bermuda and launched in 1807. She was sold in 1814.
  was a  wooden screw gunvessel launched in 1860, sold on 25 April 1872 at Hong Kong for mercantile use and renamed Formosa.
  was a  ASW trawler launched in 1942 and sold in 1946.

Citations

References
 
 
 

Royal Navy ship names